The 2016 Emporia State Hornets football team represented Emporia State University in the 2016 NCAA Division II football season. The Hornets played their home games on the newly-renovated Jones Field at Francis G. Welch Stadium in Emporia, Kansas, as they have done since 1937. 2016 was the 119th season in school history. The Hornets were led by head coach Garin Higgins, finished his 15th overall season, and 10th overall at Emporia State. Emporia State has a member of the Mid-America Intercollegiate Athletics Association since 1991.

Preseason
The Hornets entered the 2016 season after finishing with an 11–3 overall, 9–2 in conference play last season under Higgins. On August 2, 2016 at the MIAA Football Media Day, the Hornets were chosen to finish tied for third place in the Coaches Poll, and fourth in the Media Poll.

Sporting News released their Top-25 on May 25, 2016, landing Emporia State at #24. On June 15, 2016, Lindy's NCAA Division II Preseason Top 25 released its poll, ranking Emporia State at #12.

On August 15, the American Football Coaches Association released the Preseason Division II Poll, landing Emporia State at #24.

On August 22, D2football.com released its Top 25 poll, ranking Emporia State 12th.

Personnel

Coaching staff
Along with Higgins, there were 10 assistants.

Roster

Schedule

Source:

Game notes, regular season

Northwest Missouri

Nebraska–Kearney

Missouri Southern

Central Missouri

Central Oklahoma

Northeastern State

Lindenwood

Pittsburg State

Fort Hays State

Missouri Western

Washburn

Game notes, post-season

Minnesota–Duluth

For the first time in school history, Emporia State was selected to host an NCAA postseason football game.

Northwest Missouri

References

Emporia State
Emporia State Hornets football seasons
Emporia State Hornets football